Eagle Field may refer to:

 Eagle Field (airport), an airport in Dos Palos, California, United States
 Eagle Field (stadium), a stadium at Winthrop University in Rock Hill, South Carolina, United States
 Eagle Field (Georgia Southern), a soccer-specific stadium at Georgia Southern University in Statesboro, Georgia, United States
 Eagle Field at GS Softball Complex, a softball stadium at Georgia Southern University in Statesboro, Georgia, United States